Erdemir Spor Kulübü, also referred to as Erdemirspor or Erdemir Zonguldak, is a professional basketball team based in the city of Zonguldak in Turkey that plays in the Turkish Basketball League. The team was founded in 2000. Their home arena is the Erdemir Sport Hall with a capacity of 1,700 seats.

The team sponsored by Erdemir. It is a Turkish steel producer.

Season by season

Current roster

Notable players
  
  Erdal Bibo
  Erkan Veyseloğlu
  Hakan Demirel
  Hakan Köseoğlu
 - Mohamed Kone
  Mark Dickel
 - Antwain Barbour
  Dewayne Jefferson
  James Thomas
  K'zell Wesson
 - Leon Williams
  Nate Funk
  Tremmell Darden

References

External links
 Official website
 TBLStat.net Team Profile

Basketball teams in Turkey
Turkish Basketball Super League teams
Sport in Zonguldak